Tabelliscolex is a genus of palaeoscolecid worm from the Early Cambrian Chengjiang biota that comprises two species, T. hexagonus and T. maanshanensis.

References 

Prehistoric protostome genera
Paleoscolecids